Jeff Robinson may refer to:

 Jeff Robinson (basketball) (born 1988), American basketball player
 Jeff Robinson (relief pitcher) (born 1960), American baseball player
 Jeff Robinson (starting pitcher) (1961–2014), American baseball player
 Jeff Robinson (American football) (born 1970), National Football League Long snapper
 Jeffrey Robinson (born 1945), author

See also
Geoffrey Robinson (disambiguation)